Beautiful Scars is a Canadian documentary film, directed by Shane Belcourt and released in 2022. Starring musician Tom Wilson and based in part on his 2017 memoir of the same name, the film depicts his exploration of the Mohawk heritage that was hidden from him by his adoptive parents until he was almost 60 years old, including his process of reconnecting and building a relationship with his birth mother.

The film premiered at the 2022 Hot Docs Canadian International Documentary Festival, where it was one of the top ten films in the Hot Docs Audience Award race.

References

External links

2022 films
2022 documentary films
Canadian documentary films
Documentary films about singers
Documentary films about First Nations
Films directed by Shane Belcourt
2020s English-language films
2020s Canadian films